The UMB World Three-cushion Championship is a professional Three-cushion billiards championship first held in 1999 for female players, with the men's event being contested since 1928.

Results 
The list of winners is shown below.

Medals (1999-2022)

See also
UMB World Three-cushion Championship

References

External links
 

Three-cushion billiards competitions
World championships in carom billiards